Roland Beaulieu (born December 21, 1944) was a Canadian politician. He served in the Legislative Assembly of New Brunswick from 1986 to 1995, as a Liberal member for the constituency of Edmundston.

References

New Brunswick Liberal Association MLAs
1944 births
Living people